Thomas Michael Romano (born October 25, 1958) is an American former Major League Baseball player.

Romano attended Henninger High School in Syracuse, New York. He did not play high school baseball for Henninger but instead represented the school in gymnastics while playing American Legion baseball. He enrolled at Coastal Carolina University after high school at the suggestion of a friend and there played for the Chanticleers baseball team.

With the Madison Muskies in 1982, Romano hit .340 with 32 doubles, 26 home runs, and 66 stolen bases; he was named Midwest League Most Valuable Player. He was a favorite of the fans, who referred to him as the "Big Cheese." In 1983 Romano hit 24 home runs with a .320 average and 89 RBIs for the Albany-Colonie A's, the AA affiliate of the Oakland Athletics.

References

External links
, or Retrosheet
Pura Pelota

1958 births
Living people
Albany A's players
American expatriate baseball players in Canada
American people of Italian descent
Baseball players from Syracuse, New York
Buffalo Bisons (minor league) players
Coastal Carolina Chanticleers baseball players
Gulf Coast Royals players
Indianapolis Indians players
Major League Baseball left fielders
Madison Muskies players
Montreal Expos players
Rochester Red Wings players
Tacoma Tigers players
Tigres de Aragua players
American expatriate baseball players in Venezuela
Utica Blue Sox players